Kais Yâakoubi, also written Kais Yakoubi (born 18 July 1966) is a Tunisian former footballer

He was capped 14 times for Tunisia and was also a squad member for the 1988 Olympics.

Honours
 Club Africain
 Tunisian Ligue Professionnelle 1 (1): 1989–1990

References

External links

1966 births
Living people
Tunisian footballers
Association football forwards
Club Africain players
Tunisia international footballers
Footballers at the 1988 Summer Olympics
Olympic footballers of Tunisia
Tunisian football managers
Expatriate football managers in Saudi Arabia
Expatriate football managers in Qatar
Expatriate football managers in Jordan
Expatriate football managers in Syria
Al-Shoulla FC managers
Al-Arabi SC (Qatar) managers
US Monastir (football) managers
AS Marsa managers
Stade Gabèsien managers
ES Beni-Khalled managers
EGS Gafsa managers
Al-Wakrah SC managers
Al-Wehdat SC managers
Tunisian expatriate football managers